Timothy McLean may refer to:

 Tim McLean (19852008), Canadian murder victim
 Timothy Blair McLean (19101982), Canadian Surgeon General